GCU may refer to:

Education 
 Georgian Court University, in Lakewood, New Jersey, United States
 Glasgow Caledonian University, in Scotland, United Kingdom
 Government College Umuahia, a secondary school in Nigeria
 Government College University (disambiguation)
 Grand Canyon University, in Phoenix, Arizona, United States
 Great Cities' Universities, an American research-sharing association

Other uses 
 Alanine, an amino acid used in the biosynthesis of proteins which may be encoded by GCU
 General Contact Unit, a class of fictional artificially intelligent starship in The Culture universe of late Scottish author Iain Banks
 Greek Catholic Union of the USA, known as GCU